Kazuhisa Kawahara may refer to:

 Kazuhisa Kawahara (footballer) (born 1987), Japanese footballer
 Kazuhisa Kawahara (actor) (born 1961), Japanese actor